Tyson is a male given name of old French origin meaning 'high-spirited',  'fire'. It is from this that a surname arose 'son of Tyson'.

Surname
Alan Tyson (1926–2000), British musicologist
Barbara Tyson (born 1964), Canadian actress
Bill Tyson, Irish writer and producer
Cathy Tyson (born 1965), British actress
Charles Tyson (1885–1964), English footballer
Cicely Tyson (1924–2021), American actress
Donald J. Tyson (1930–2011), American business executive and billionaire
Edward Tyson (1650–1708), English scientist and physician
Frank Tyson (born 1930), English cricketer
Ian Tyson (1933–2022), Canadian singer-songwriter
Isaac Tyson (1792–1861), American mining industrialist
Jacob Tyson (1773–1848), American politician
James Tyson (1819–1898), Australian pastoralist
J. Anthony Tyson (born 1940), American physicist and astronomer
John M. Tyson (born 1953), American judge
John W. Tyson, founder of Tyson Foods
June Tyson (1936–1992), American jazz singer
Keith Tyson (born 1969), British artist
Laura Tyson (born 1947), American economist and presidential adviser
Liam Tyson (born 1969), British guitarist
Lawrence Tyson (1861–1929), American politician
Mike Tyson (born 1966), American boxer and former undisputed heavyweight champion of the world
Mike Tyson (baseball) (born 1950), American baseball player
Mike Tyson (American football) (born 1993), American football player
Mildred Lund Tyson (1895-1989) American choral director, composer, organist and soprano
Nathan Tyson (born 1982), English football player
Neil deGrasse Tyson (born 1958), American astrophysicist
Paul Tyson (1886–1950), American football coach
Richard Tyson (born 1956), American actor
Ron Tyson (born 1948), American singer
Sarah Tyson Rorer (1849–1937), American writer
Stuart Tyson Smith, American Egyptologist
Sylvia Tyson (born 1940), Canadian musician
Tiger Tyson (born 1977), American pornographic actor
Timothy Tyson (born 1959), American historian
Turkey Tyson (1914–2000), American baseball player
Ty Tyson (1888–1968), American sports broadcaster
Vanessa C. Tyson, American political scientist

First name
Tyson Alualu (born 1987), American football player
Tyson Andrews (born 1990), Australian rugby league footballer
Tyson Apostol (born 1979), American reality TV star
Tyson Ballou (born 1976), American model
Tyson Beckford (born 1970), American model
Tyson Beukeboom (born 1991), Canadian rugby union footballer
Tyson Barrie (born 1991), Canadian ice hockey player
Tyson Brummett (1984–2020), American baseball player
Tyson Bull (born 1993), Australian artistic gymnast
Tyson Caiado (born 1988), Indian footballer
Tyson Campbell (born 2000), American football player
Tyson Carter (born 1998), American basketball player
Tyson Chandler (born 1982), American basketball player
Tyson Clabo (born 1981), American football player
Tyson Cole (born 1970), American restaurateur
Tyson Demos (born 1988), Australian basketball player
Tyson Dux (born 1978), Canadian professional wrestler
Tyson Edwards (born 1976), Australian football player
Tyson Etienne (born 1999), American basketball player
Tyson Farago (born 1991), Canadian soccer player
Tyson Foerster (born 2002), Canadian ice hockey player
Tyson Frizell (born 1991), Welsh rugby union footballer
Tyson Fury (born 1988), British boxer
Tyson Gay (born 1982), American sprinter
Tyson Gillies (born 1988), Canadian baseball player
Tyson Griffin (born 1984), American mixed martial artist
Tyson Helton (born 1977), American football coach
Tyson Hepburn, Canadian-American director
Tyson Hesse, American comic book artist
Tyson Houseman (born 1990), Canadian actor
Tyson Jackson (born 1986), American football player
Tyson Jerry (born 1983), Canadian photographer
Tyson Jolly (born 1997), American basketball player
Tyson Jost (born 1998), Canadian ice hockey player
Tyson Keats (born 1981), New Zealand rugby union footballer
Tyson Kidd (born 1980), Canadian professional wrestler
Tyson Lane (born 1976), Australian rules footballer
Tyson Larson (born 1986), American politician
Tyson Lee (disambiguation), multiple people
Tyson Mao (born 1984), American Rubik's Cube solver
Tyson Meade (born 1963), American musician
Tyson Miller (born 1995), American baseball player
Tyson Motsenbocker (born 1986), American songwriter
Tyson Nam (born 1983), American mixed martial artist
Tyson Nash (born 1975), Canadian ice hockey player
Tyson Patterson (born 1978), American basketball player
Tyson Pedro (born 1991), Australian mixed martial artist
Tyson Pencer (born 1989), Canadian football player
Tysson Poots (born 1988), American football player
Tyson Ritter (born 1984), American singer-songwriter
Tyson R. Roberts (born 1940), American ichthyologist
Tyson Ross (born 1987), American baseball player
Tyson Runningwolf, American politician
Tyson Sexsmith (born 1989), Canadian ice hockey player
Tyson Slattery (born 1990), Australian rules footballer
Tyson Smith (disambiguation), multiple people
Tyson Stengle (born 1998), Australian rules footballer
Tyson Stenglein (born 1980), Australian rules footballer
Tyson Sullivan (born 1986), American actor
Tyson Summers (born 1980), American football coach
Tyson Tan (born 1984), Chinese artist
Tyson Thompson (born 1981), American football player
Tyson Wahl (born 1984), American soccer player
Tyson Walter (born 1978), American football player
Tyson Wheeler (born 1975), American basketball player
Ty'Son Williams (born 1996), American football player
Tyson Yoshi (born 1994), Hong Kong rapper and hip hop artist

Fictional characters
Tyson Granger (Takao Kinomiya in Japanese version), protagonist from the anime series Beyblade
Tyson, a rival of Ash Ketchum in the anime series Pokémon: Advanced Battle
Tyson the Cyclops, fictional character in the Percy Jackson & The Olympians novels by Rick Riordan
Tyson Rios, fictional character in the video game Army of Two
Kyla Tyson, fictional character in the television series Holby City

See also
 Tison (disambiguation)
 Dennis

Masculine given names
English masculine given names
English-language surnames 
Patronymic surnames